Maura O'Neill (born September 6, 1956) served as the First Chief of Innovation and was a Senior Counselor to the Administrator in January 2009 at the United States Agency for International Development. She currently is a Distinguished Teaching Fellow in the Lester Center for Entrepreneurship and Innovation at University of California, Berkeley Haas School of Business.

While at USAID, O'Neill co-led USAID Forward, the global initiative to reform foreign assistance. She adapted venture capital and drug discovery methods to drive faster, cheaper, more sustainable solutions to global governance, health, food security and economic growth. Co-creating the Development Innovation Ventures (DIV), it attracted partnerships with the Bill and Melinda Gates Foundation, the Skoll Foundation and later its offshoot, the Global Innovation Fund, with UK, Sweden and Australia AID agencies and Omidyar Network. She also co-created the Development Innovation Ventures, now known as the Global Innovation Fund, which has received 6,000 applicants since 2010.

Before USAID, she served as the Senior Advisor of Energy and Climate and Chief of Staff for the Under Secretary at the United States Department of Agriculture. There, she authored President Obama's Biofuels Strategy. In 2008 to 2009, she served as the Chief of Staff for United States Senator Maria Cantwell.

Career 

O'Neill founded four companies in the fields of electricity efficiency, smart grid and customer info systems and billing, e-commerce and digital education. In 1989, she was named the Greater Seattle Business Person of the Year.

In 2008, O'Neill helped found Baltimore Leadership School for Young Women.

From 1982 to 1995, O'Neill founded her first company, O'Neill & Company, advising electric utilities on energy efficiency and helping launch one of the largest curbside recycling programs in the country. In 1992, she served as Chairwoman for the Washington State Women's Political Caucus. O'Neill also advised policy makers on innovation and large-scale consumer adoption.

In 1996, O'Neill was the President and CEO of ConnexT – a software company that served the deregulated energy market She later became a delegate to the Advanced Study Institute of NATO on the utility industry.

Later, O'Neill created Improvemybusiness.com, a company designed to help small businesses through the Internet.

In 2003, O'Neill became the CEO of Explore Life, a public-private company to improve Seattle's life sciences industry and increase the region's rate of commercial research.

Faculty 
In 2021, O'Neill was the program facilitator and lecturer of the Blockchain Technology program at Berkely Haas School of Business.

In 2009, O'Neill went to work at USAID. She co-led the institution of USAID Forward - the agency's major reform initiative under President Obama. O'Neill led the agency's move to incorporate more public-private partnerships as a key component for effective development. She led the IDEA (Innovative Development through Entrepreneurship Acceleration) project. O'Neill was named the First Chief of Innovation and a Senior Counselor to the Administrator in January 2009 at the United States Agency for International Development.

Early life and education 

O'Neill was raised in the San Francisco Bay Area and moved to Seattle in 1975, where she studied environmental studies at the University of Washington. She later received MBAs from Columbia University and the University of California, Berkeley and a doctorate from the University of Washington.

O'Neill lives in Seattle, Washington with her husband, with whom she has two children.

References

External links

Living people
Educators from Seattle
American women educators
University of Washington alumni
Columbia Business School alumni
1956 births
Obama administration personnel
United States Department of Agriculture officials
Haas School of Business alumni
People of the United States Agency for International Development
21st-century American women